Garfield Originals is a 2D animated short series created by Jim Davis and Philippe Vidal. The series premiered in France on December 6, 2019 on France 3 and Okoo; it is also available on France.tv (a streaming platform available only in France). Half of the show's episodes aired on December 6, 2019; the remaining half aired on June 17, 2020.

The series was developed with France's Dargaud Media and Ellipsanime.

Characters
Garfield
Jon Arbuckle
Odie
Nermal
Dr. Liz Wilson
Arlene
Pooky
Mouse
Herman Post
Purple dog

Cast

French Voice Cast
Véronique Soufflet
Antoine Schoumsky
Gérard Surugue

Structure
It is composed of 120 short films of thirty seconds. Five short films will be divided into two segments. Twelve short films are available now on the France TV website. As of October 2021, some of the shorts are now available on Nickelodeon's website.

Production
MadLab Animations, originally created by Ankama Animations and Ellipsanime Productions, is the animation studio for the show.

Episodes
 1. "Burping Madness", December 6, 2019
 2. "Can't Sleep!", December 6, 2019
 3. "Meal Time", December 6, 2019
 4. "Tricking Nermal", December 6, 2019
 5. "Pet Door", December 6, 2019
 6. "Pumpkin Trouble", December 6, 2019
 7. "Treadmill Trouble", December 6, 2019
 8. "Waking Jon!", December 6, 2019
 9. "Mice Phobia", December 6, 2019
 10. "Chair Mayhem", December 6, 2019
 11. "Sweet Arlene", December 6, 2019
 12. "Up A Tree", December 6, 2019
 13. "Did You Say Cake?", June 17, 2020
 14. "Mosquito", June 17, 2020
 15. "Mind the Vet", June 17, 2020
 16. "Big Dog", June 17, 2020
 17. "Spider Wars", June 17, 2020
 18. "Donuts Mania", June 17, 2020
 19. "Beach Boogie", June 17, 2020
 20. "Mailman!", June 17, 2020
 21. "Sleepwalk!", June 17, 2020
 22. "Scratching!", June 17, 2020
 23. "Bouncing Ball", June 17, 2020
 24. "Pookie Time", June 17, 2020

References

Garfield
2010s American animated television series
2020s American animated television series
2019 American television series debuts
2020 American television series endings
2010s French animated television series
2020s French animated television series
2019 French television series debuts
2020 French television series endings
American children's animated comedy television series
Animated television series about cats
Animated television series about dogs
Animated television series without speech
English-language television shows
French children's animated comedy television series
French-language television shows